Houcktown is an unincorporated community in Hancock County, in the U.S. state of Ohio.

History
Houcktown was originally called North Liberty, and under the latter name was platted in 1853 by Jacob F. Houck. A post office called Houcktown was established in 1862, and remained in operation until 1903.

Houcktown is the birthplace of baseball player Dummy Hoy. On April 5, 2022 a historic marker in Houcktown was dedicated to Dummy Hoy.

References

Unincorporated communities in Hancock County, Ohio
Unincorporated communities in Ohio